Elena Andreevna Nikolaeva (born 9 February 1983) is a Russian actress.

Biography
Elena Nikolaeva was born in Moscow, Russian SFSR, Soviet Union. She graduated from the Russian Academy of Theatre Arts in 2006. Currently, she works in the State Theatre of Nations.

Personal life
Elena is married and has a son and a daughter.

Filmography
 2007 Roly-poly toy as Tanya 
 2007 Pen and sword (TV Series) as Nastya
 2008 Kazaki-robbers (TV Mini-Series) as Sashka
 2008 Girl (TV Movie) as Lena Yartseva
 2009 Soundtrack of Passion as Vita
 2009 I'll be back (TV Series) as Gulya
 2012 Freud's method (TV Series) as Lidiya Fadeeva
 2012 While blooming fern (TV Series) as Olesya Murashova / Polina Murashova, twin sister of Olesya
 2014 Two winters and three summers (TV series) as Varvara Inyakhina

References

External links 
 
 Elena Nikolaeva's profile at the website of the Theatre of Nations 

1983 births
Living people
Russian film actresses
Russian television actresses
Russian stage actresses
Actresses from Moscow
Russian Academy of Theatre Arts alumni